Nina Stojanović (born 30 July 1996) is a Serbian professional tennis player. On 2 March 2020, Stojanović reached a career-high singles ranking of world No. 81. On 17 January 2022, she peaked at No. 37 in the WTA doubles rankings. She has won two doubles titles on the WTA Tour, and ten singles and 24 doubles titles on the ITF Women's Circuit.

As a junior, Stojanović reached three Grand Slam semifinals in doubles, each on a different surface, the French Open and Wimbledon in 2013, and the Australian Open in 2014. As a professional, she made her debut on the WTA Tour in 2016. In 2019, Stojanović reached her first WTA semifinal in singles at the Jiangxi International Open and also won her first doubles title at the Baltic Open. That year, she also debuted in the top 100 in singles, while in doubles, she made her top-100 debut in 2017, when she reached three WTA tournament finals.

Junior career

Stojanovic is a former junior world No. 17 (achieved April 2013), she won three singles and ten doubles junior titles in total. She made her ITF Junior Circuit debut at the Grade-4 Malta U18 ITF Junior Tournament in March 2010 at the age of 13. In August 2010, she made her doubles debut at the Slovenian Junior Open. She played her last junior tournament at the European Summer Cups (girls) in August 2014. 

In June 2011, she won her first ITF title at the Grade-5 Podgorica Open in singles, while in doubles she reached the final. After that, she won her first doubles title at the Grade-4 Carthago Cup. The following year she reached the final of the Grade-3 Ozerov Cup in Moscow, and won the title in doubles. In July 2012, she won Grade 1 Mediterranee Avenir in Casablanca in doubles. In November 2012, she reached quarterfinals of the Grade-1 Yucatan Cup, where she lost to Marcela Zacarías. In December 2012, she made her debut at the Orange Bowl, but lost in the first round in singles, and in the second round in doubles.

In January 2013, she won Grade-2 Slovak Junior Open, defeating Maria Marfutina in the final. There she also won the title in doubles. She followed this with the quarterfinal of the Grade-1 Czech International Junior Indoor Championships and the semifinal of the Grade-2 ITF Junior Circuit tournament in Monastir, Tunisia. She continued to progress, reaching the singles semifinals and winning the doubles title at the Grade-1 International Junior Championships, singles and doubles titles at the Grade-2 Open Ouest Provence in Istres and the singles final and doubles title at the Grade-1 Open International Junior de Beaulieu-sur-Mer. She then took part at the Trofeo Bonfiglio, where she reached the second round in singles and the first round in doubles. At the 2013 French Open, she made her Grand Slam debut, but lost in the first round to Jamie Loeb. However, in doubles, she reached semifinals alongside Alice Matteucci. Same results in both singles and doubles, she made at the 2013 Wimbledon. In August, she reached the final of the Grade-1 Canadian Open Junior Championships in doubles. At the 2013 US Open, she reached quarterfinals in doubles. In 2014, she won the Grade-1 AGL Loy Yang Traralgon Junior International and then entered the semifinals of the Australian Open, both in doubles.

Professional career

2011–15: First steps
Stojanović made her ITF Women's Circuit debut at the $10K event in Pirot in October 2011. There, as a wildcard player, she lost to Lina Gjorcheska in the first round of the main draw. During the season of 2012, she take part of the two $10K event in Serbia, Palić and Pirot, but failed in the first rounds of both competitions. In September 2013, she won her first match at the $10K event in Vrnjačka Banja and later reached quarterfinal. In December 2013, she made her ITF doubles debut at the $10K event in Sharm El Sheikh, and then in March 2014, she won her first ITF doubles in the same city. In May 2014, she won title in her first ITF singles final, defeating Katie Boulter in the final of $10K event in Sharm El Sheikh. In December 2014, she won her first $25K-level title at the Navi Mumbai in both singles and doubles. During the season of 2015, she did not produce any significant results in singles, but reached two $50K semifinal in doubles, Wuhan and Xuzhou.

2016: WTA Tour debut
In May 2016, she reached her first significant ITF final af the $50K Tianjin, but lost to Aryna Sabalenka in three sets. At the 2016 US Open, she had her first attempt to play in a Grand Slam main draw, but lost in qualifying. In October 2016, she made her WTA Tour debut at the Tianjin Open, but lost after qualifying in the first round to Magda Linette; so she did there in doubles. Nearly after that, she won her first major ITF title at the $50K Liuzhou Cup, defeating Jang Su-jeong in the final. During the season, she also had success in doubles. She first reached semifinal of the $100K Anning Open in May, and then won two $100K events, in Shenzhen and Dubai.

2017: Doubles - three WTA finals, Grand Slam and top 100 debut
In January, Stojanović recorded her first WTA Tour main-draw wins as a qualifier at the Shenzhen Open, defeating fifth seed and world No. 28 Tímea Babos in the first round and Ons Jabeur in the second round, before losing to world No. 52 and eventual champion, Kateřina Siniaková, in the quarterfinals. Later, she reached the quarterfinal of the $60K Kültürpark Cup and semifinal of the $60K Suzhou Ladies Open. She failed to reach main-draw at the all four majors, losing in qualifyings.  

More success came in doubles. That year, she reached three WTA finals in doubles with three different partners, losing each time. First, she entered final of the Morocco Open in May with Maryna Zanevska, then at the Swiss Open in July with Viktorija Golubic and finally at the Tianjin Open in October with Dalila Jakupović. She also reached semifinals at the Hungarian Ladies Open, the Monterrey Open and Copa Colsanitas. At the French Open, she made her Grand Slam main-draw debut, but lost in the first round. She entered the top 100 in doubles in May, for the first time.

2018: Top 50 in doubles, struggling with form and injury

Stojanović performed better on the ITF Women's Circuit than on WTA Tour. In May, she reached quarterfinals of the $100K Khimki event, losing there to Vitalia Diatchenko. Soon after that, she won the $60K Baotou tournament, defeating Xu Shilin in the final. She did not drop a single set during the tournament. She followed this with the quarterfinal of the $60K Hódmezővásárhely Ladies Open, where she lost to Irina Khromacheva. In September, she reached another ITF quarterfinal, at the $60K Open de Valencia, where she lost to Paula Badosa. By the end of the year, she finished runner-up at two $25K events. In the late season, she got injured and was out of the tennis for some time. 

In doubles, she reached the third round of the Australian Open alongside Viktorija Golubic. It was the first time that she reached third round of a major. At the Hungarian Ladies Open in February, she reached semifinals alongside Anastasiya Komardina. In July, she won the $80K Prague, partnering Cornelia Lister. In September, she won the $60K Open de Valencia alongside Irina Khromacheva. During the year, she also reached semifinals of the $60K Burnie International and $100K ITF Khimki, as well as finals of the $60K Hódmezővásárhely Open and $60K Reinert Open. In February, she debuted in the top 50 in doubles.

2019: Top 100 in singles, first WTA Tour title in doubles
After missing the first months of the season due to injury, Stojanović returned to court in April 2019 and as a qualifier reached her second career WTA Tour quarterfinal in May at the Nuremberg Cup. She defeated fourth seed, last year finalist, and world No. 53 Alison Riske, and world No. 72, Sara Sorribes Tormo, before losing to Sorana Cîrstea. In July, she won the $60K Reinert Open in Versmond. Then she reached another WTA quarterfinal as a qualifier at the Baltic Open by defeating fourth seed and world No. 42 Aliaksandra Sasnovich and fellow qualifier Paula Ormaechea before she was stopped by Bernarda Pera. She was even better in the doubles competition, winning her first WTA tournament title, partnering with Sharon Fichman. After failing to qualify for the US Open, she won the $60K Changsha Open, defeating Aleksandrina Naydenova in the final. The following week, she reached her first WTA singles semifinal at the Jiangxi Open by beating Wang Yafan, Samantha Stosur, and Kateryna Kozlova. In her semifinal match, she lost to the eventual champion, Rebecca Peterson. She continued her good performances, reaching quarterfinals of the Guangzhou Open, winning the $80K Internationaux de Poitiers tournament by defeating Liudmila Samsonova in straight sets and reaching quarterfinals of the $100K Shenzhen Open. In September, she debuted in the top 100 in singles.

2020: Grand Slam debut in singles, out of form
Starting the year inside top 100, allowed her entering the main draw of the Australian Open. However, she lost to Anastasia Pavlyuchenkova in the first round. In doubles, she reached the third round, alongside Darija Jurak. She then competed at the $60K Andrézieux-Bouthéon, where she reached quarterfinals in singles and semifinals in doubles. After that, she lost in the first round of all singles tournaments, including the French Open and US Open. In doubles, she reached semifinals of the $60K Cagnes-sur-Mer and $80K Macon and the second round of the French Open.

2021: Consistency, SF in Grand Slam women's doubles, Olympic mixed doubles

Stojanović won her first main draw match in singles at a Grand Slam when she defeated Irina-Camelia Begu in straight sets at the Australian Open, before losing to Serena Williams in the second round. Despite periodically having problems with injuries, she reached at least the second round in singles on eleven occasions, including third round as a qualifier at WTA 1000 Miami Open, when she had to forfeit the match to Naomi Osaka due to injury. She was even better on grass, reaching a semifinal at Nottingham, a run which included a win over grass court specialist Donna Vekić, before ultimately losing to first seed and eventual champion Johanna Konta in three sets.

In doubles, Stojanović reached her first Grand Slam semifinal at the Australian Open. She also partnered with compatriot Aleksandra Krunić to win her second career WTA doubles title at the inaugural Serbia Open, as well as to reach the quarterfinal of Wimbledon. As a result, she reentered the top 50 in doubles reaching a then career-high of world No. 42 on 19 July 2021.

At the Tokyo Olympics, she paired with world No. 1, Novak Djokovic, in the mixed doubles event, and the team reached the semifinals before losing to Elena Vesnina and Aslan Karatsev. Due to Djokovic's withdrawal from the bronze medal match, they finished the tournament on 4th place.

Stojanović finished season with a career-high top 40 ranking in doubles.

National representation
Playing for the Serbia Fed Cup team, Stojanović has a win–loss record of 9–11. She made her debut in February 2014, partnering with Jovana Jakšić in their World Group II tie against Canada, when they defeated Gabriela Dabrowski and Sharon Fichman, in straight sets.

Personal life
Stojanović has an aggressive style of play. The WTA profile says, her favourite surface is hardcourt, and her tennis idol growing up was Maria Sharapova.

Performance timelines

Only main-draw results in WTA Tour, Grand Slam tournaments, Fed Cup/Billie Jean King Cup and Olympic Games are included in win–loss records.

Singles
Current through the 2022 French Open.

Doubles
Current through the 2022 French Open.

Mixed doubles

Olympic medal finals

Mixed doubles: 1 (4th place)

WTA career finals

Doubles: 6 (2 titles, 4 runner-ups)

ITF Circuit finals

Singles: 18 (10 titles, 8 runner-ups)

Doubles: 34 (24 titles, 10 runner-ups)

Fed Cup/Billie Jean King Cup participation
Current after the 2020–21 Billie Jean King Cup.

Singles (2–8)

Doubles (7–3)

Notes

References

External links

 
 
 

1996 births
Living people
Tennis players from Belgrade
Serbian female tennis players
Tennis players at the 2020 Summer Olympics
Olympic tennis players of Serbia